Terence Peter McPhillips  (born 1 October 1968) is an English professional football manager and former player who played as a forward in the Football League. He is currently the assistant manager National League North side  Southport.

Early life
McPhillips attended Maricourt High School.

Professional career
McPhillips was a forward and he began his career in the youth team at Liverpool F.C. He did not make a first team appearance at Anfield and left Liverpool for Halifax Town in 1987. He soon made his mark by scoring a hat-trick in a 3–3 draw against Carlisle United in the 1988–89 season. He went on to score 29 goals in 93 appearances for Halifax Town. In 1991, he signed for Crewe Alexandra on a free transfer, scoring once in six league appearances for Crewe. He dropped into non-league football with Fleetwood and Barrow before joining Nantwich Town in March 1994. He then served Marine, Burscough, Ashton United, Caernarfon Town and Bangor City.

Coaching career
McPhillips became Academy Director at Crewe Alexandra, in 1992 and spent 14 years as a youth coach at the club before joining the Academy Staff of Blackburn Rovers in 2006. He set up the Merseyside-based TMS (Technique/Movement/Skill) football school in 1996.

He later managed the Blackburn Rovers Youth team that reached the 2012 FA Youths Cup Final, but were defeated by Chelsea. In January 2012, he was appointed caretaker assistant manager to Gary Bowyer after Henning Berg was sacked as manager. He was re-appointed assistant manager from June 2013 to 2015.

In 2016, he followed Gary Bowyer to Blackpool F.C. as a chief scout and assistant manager. He was appointed caretaker manager of Blackpool F.C. on 6 August 2018, after Gary Bowyer left the club. On 10 September 2018, he was made permanent manager of Blackpool. McPhillips resigned as Blackpool manager on 5 July 2019, having informed the club's board that he had no long-term desire to be a manager.

In 2020 McPhillips was appointed attack coach and set piece specialist at  East Bengal to work alongside manager Robbie Fowler.

McPhillips on 5 October 2021 was appointed the assistant manager at  Southport.

Managerial statistics

References

1968 births
Living people
Blackburn Rovers F.C. non-playing staff
Blackpool F.C. non-playing staff
Crewe Alexandra F.C. players
English Football League players
English footballers
Halifax Town A.F.C. players
Fleetwood Town F.C. players
Barrow A.F.C. players
Bangor City F.C. players
Nantwich Town F.C. players
Northampton Town F.C. players
Footballers from Manchester
English Football League managers
English football managers
Blackpool F.C. managers
Association football forwards
Caernarfon Town F.C. players
Crewe Alexandra F.C. non-playing staff
Southport F.C. non-playing staff